Following is a list of notable restaurants known for serving Pacific Northwest cuisine:

 Beast, Portland, Oregon, U.S.
 Canlis, Seattle
 Clarklewis, Portland, Oregon
 Dóttir (2019–2022), Portland, Oregon
 Fenouil, Portland, Oregon
 The Herbfarm, Woodinville, Washington 
 Jacqueline (2016–present), Portland, Oregon
 Lincoln Restaurant (2008–2017), Portland, Oregon
 Lovely Hula Hands (2009–2013), Portland, Oregon
 Ned Ludd, Portland, Oregon
 Paley's Place (1995–2021), Portland, Oregon
 Produce Row Café, Portland, Oregon
 Radar (2012–2022), Portland, Oregon
 SkyCity, Seattle
 Wildwood, Portland, Oregon

Pacific Northwest